Civilization Phaze III is the sixty-third album by Frank Zappa, released posthumously as a double album on October 31, 1994. It was the first studio album of new material from Zappa since 1986's Jazz from Hell. The album marks the third part of a conceptual continuity that started with We're Only in It for the Money (1968), with the second part being a re-edited version of Zappa's 1967 album Lumpy Gravy. Zappa described the album as a "two-act opera", but in lieu of traditional recitatives and arias, it alternates brief spoken word passages with musical numbers created on a Synclavier using a combination of sampled and synthesized sounds. Much of the sampled material in the second half of the album was originally recorded by Ensemble Modern and other musicians to Zappa's specifications.

The storyline of Civilization Phaze III involves a group of people living inside a piano, and the menacing reality of the outside world. The album's themes include personal isolation and nationalism. Much of the album's improvised dialogue was originally recorded as part of sessions which produced We're Only in It for the Money and Uncle Meat, which contained some dialogue by the same speakers, and some of the dialogue on this album previously appeared on the re-edited version of Lumpy Gravy released in 1968. New dialogue was recorded by Zappa in 1991, and includes similarly improvised dialogue by members of Ensemble Modern, Zappa's daughter Moon Unit and actor Michael Rapaport.

Background 

In 1967, while recording We're Only in It for the Money with the Mothers of Invention, Frank Zappa discovered that the strings of Apostolic Studios' grand piano would resonate if a person spoke near those strings. The "piano people" experiment involved Zappa having various speakers improvise dialogue using topics offered by Zappa. Various people contributed to these sessions, including Eric Clapton, Rod Stewart and Tim Buckley. The "piano people" voices primarily consisted of Mothers of Invention bandmembers Motorhead Sherwood and Roy Estrada, Spider Barbour (leader of the rock band Chrysalis), All-Night John (the manager of the studio) and Louis Cuneo, who was noted for his laugh, which sounded like a "psychotic turkey".

In 1992, Zappa recorded The Yellow Shark with the Ensemble Modern orchestra, and sampled their instrumentation with his Synclavier. After revisiting his archives, he decided to create an album which would combine the 1967 "piano people" dialogue, Synclavier music, performances by the Ensemble Modern, and newly recorded dialogue. The project began under the title Lumpy Gravy, Phase 3 (with phase one being We're Only in It for the Money and phase two being the 1968 version of Lumpy Gravy), but was later changed to Civilization Phaze III.

Zappa recorded new dialogue segments to accompany the original "piano people" recordings. The new dialogue speakers included members of the Ensemble Modern, Moon Zappa, Dweezil Zappa and actor Michael Rapaport.

Concept and music
The album's storyline was conceived via improvised dialogue involving a series of randomly chosen words, phrases and concepts, which included motors, pigs, ponies, dark water, nationalism, smoke, music, beer and personal isolation. The music was conceived as an opera pantomime, and is dark and ominous. The Ensemble Modern samples allowed the Synclavier to produce richer-sounding music than Zappa's previous works using the machine, which produced the cruder-sounding music on albums such as Jazz from Hell. University of Washington music theory chair Jonathan W. Bernard suggests that Civilization Phaze III is heavily influenced by Zappa's disenchantment with avant-garde composition and Zappa's acute awareness of his own mortality. Bernard suggests that Civilization Phase III is Zappa's last, greatest attempt at being recognized as a composer of "serious music".

Release
Civilization Phaze III was the final album Frank Zappa completed before he died. It was published posthumously by Barking Pumpkin Records on October 31, 1994, solely as a mail order album, with no advertising or promotion; the album subsequently received a strong number of orders from Zappa's fanbase. Rykodisc was given the option of distributing the album nationally, but the label ultimately did not distribute it.

The album was also not released with Zappa's other works in the 2012 reissue of his catalog, but it can still be ordered from the artist's official website. "I think it's very much about finishing his life," said his widow, Gail Zappa, in an interview. "After he finished this, he said, 'I've done everything that I can'".

Reception 

AllMusic reviewer François Couture wrote: "It belongs to his corpus of 'serious music'. [...] The original artwork and packaging are stunning and luxurious, a match for the music, some of the most compelling Zappa wrote outside of the rock realm." However, some critics felt that the "piano people" narrative did not hold up for a double album.
The album won the 1995 Grammy Award for Best Recording Package.

Track listing

Personnel 
 Frank Zappa – producer, compiler, editor, composer, performer, conductor, liner notes
 Ensemble Modern – orchestra
 Dick Kunc – engineer (1967)
 David Dondorf – engineer (1991)
 Todd Yvega – engineer (1991)
 Spencer Chrislu – engineer (1991)
 Uri Balashov – cover design
 Command A Studios – art direction

 1967 voices
 Spider Barbour
 All-Night John
 Frank Zappa
 Euclid James "Motorhead" Sherwood
 Roy Estrada
 Louis "The Turkey" Cuneo
 Monica
 Gilly Townley
 Unknown Girl #1
 Unknown Girl #2

 1991 voices
 Moon Unit Zappa
 Michael Rapaport
 Ali N. Askin
 Catherine Milliken
 Walt Fowler
 Todd Yvega
 Michael Svoboda
 Michael Gross
 William Forman
 Uwe Dierksen
 Stefan Dohr
 Daryl Smith
 Franck Ollu
 Hermann Kretzschmar
 Dweezil Zappa

Note and references 

Note

 References

1994 albums
Concept albums
Frank Zappa albums
Albums published posthumously
Barking Pumpkin Records albums
Computer music
Electronic albums by American artists
Classical albums by American artists
Sound collage albums